The 1903–04 Army Cadets men's ice hockey season was the inaugural season of play for the program.

Season
Army began their program in the spring semester of the 1903–04 school term. Captain Edward Leonard King, the head coach of the football team, agreed to coach the ice hockey team as well. The team began its oldest rivalry against the Royal Military College of Canada (then called Kingston Military Academy), winning the first meeting 11–0.

Roster

Standings

Schedule and Results

|-
!colspan=12 style=";" | Regular Season

References

Army Black Knights men's ice hockey seasons
Army
Army
Army
Army